Dan Sai is a district (amphoe) in the western part of Loei province, northeastern Thailand.

Geography
Neighboring districts are (from the east clockwise): Phu Ruea of Loei Province; Lom Kao and Khao Kho of Phetchabun province; Nakhon Thai of Phitsanulok province; and Na Haeo of Loei. To the north is Xaignabouli province of Laos.

The source of the Pa Sak River is in the mountains in the eastern part of the district. A large part of the district is a portion of the Phu Hin Rong Kla National Park. Phu Thap Buek, the highest mountain of the Phetchabun Range, is at the southern end of the district. To the southeast is the Phu Luang Wildlife Sanctuary.

The northern part of the district reaches the southern end of the Luang Prabang Range mountain area of the Thai highlands.

History
According to General Apirat Kongsompong, on 5 November 1976, King Rama X, then an army captain and crown prince, engaged with communist insurgents in Ban Mak Kheng of Dan Sai District. The general noted that, "His Majesty was in the operation base, ate and slept like other soldiers. His Majesty visited local residents, gave moral support and fought shoulder by shoulder with brave soldiers."

Administration

Central administration 
Dan Sai is divided into 10 sub-districts (tambons), which are further subdivided into 99 administrative villages (mubans).

Local administration 
There are two sub-district municipalities (thesaban tambons) in the district:
 Dan Sai consisting of parts of sub-district Dan Sai.
 Si Song Rak consisting of parts of sub-district Dan Sai.

There are nine sub-district administrative organizations (SAO) in the district:
 Pak Man consisting of sub-district Pak Man.
 Na Di consisting of sub-district Na Di.
 Khok Ngam consisting of sub-district Khok Ngam.
 Phon Sung consisting of sub-district Phon Sung.
 Ipum consisting of sub-district Ipum.
 Kok Sathon consisting of sub-district Kok Sathon.
 Pong consisting of sub-district Pong.
 Wang Yao consisting of sub-district Wang Yao.
 Na Ho consisting of sub-district Na Ho.

Local festivals
Dan Sai is the place where Phi Ta Khon traditions are known around the world. The Thai spirit masked festival is held annually after the full moon of the sixth Thai lunar month (around late June to early July).

References

External links
amphoe.com (Thai)

Dan Sai